New Jack Swing is a song by Wreckx-N-Effect (then called Wrecks-N-Effect) from their 1989 debut album Wrecks-N-Effect, which featured special guest star Teddy Riley. The song hit number one on the Billboard Rap chart. It featured samples of The Village Callers' 1967 song "Hector", Parliament's 1975 song "Give Up the Funk", and James Brown’s Funky Drummer, Funky President and Soul Power. The single reached number one on the Billboard Hot Rap Tracks chart.

"New Jack Swing" was first featured in The Fresh Prince of Bel Air episode "Someday Your Prince Will Be In Effect". It also appears in the Grand Theft Auto: San Andreas video game soundtrack, on the fictitious radio station CSR 103.9.

References

1989 debut singles
1989 songs
Motown singles
New jack swing songs